Matrimony or Marriage is a socially or ritually recognised union between spouses.

Matrimony may also refer to:
Matrimony (solitaire), a solitaire card game
Matrimony (card game), a multi-player card game
The Matrimony, a 2007 Chinese horror film starring Fan Bingbing
"The Matrimony" (song), a 2015 song by Wale with Usher
Matrimony Creek, a stream in North Carolina and Virginia
Matrimony (film), a 1915 silent film drama

See also
Baháʼí marriage
Buddhist view of marriage
Christian views on marriage
Marriage in Hinduism
Marriage in Islam
Jewish views on marriage